Raymond Henry Charles Warren (born 7 November 1928) is a British composer and university teacher.

He studied at Cambridge, and taught at Queen's University Belfast, where he was the first person in the UK to be given a personal chair in composition in 1966, before becoming Hamilton Harty Professor of Music in 1969. He was Stanley Hugh Badock Professor of Music at the University of Bristol from 1972 until his retirement in 1994.

His works include a choral Passion, a Violin Concerto, three Symphonies, a Requiem, the oratorio Continuing Cities and an extensive amount of music for children, young people and community music making. He has also written six operas. He currently lives at Clifton in Bristol.

Biography

Raymond Warren was born in 1928 and studied at Cambridge University (1949–52) reading mathematics at first and then changing to music under Boris Ord and Robin Orr. Later he studied privately with Michael Tippett (1952–60), Lennox Berkeley (1958) and Benjamin Britten (1961). From 1955 to 1972 he taught at Queen's University, Belfast, where from 1966 he held a personal Chair in composition. While in Belfast, an association with the Lyric Players theatre company involved writing music for many of the plays of W. B. Yeats. 

For the years 1966–72 he was Resident Composer to the Ulster Orchestra, writing for them a number of orchestral works and also conducting the Orchestra in a series of Sunday afternoon concerts of contemporary music. In 1972 he was appointed Professor of Music at the University of Bristol, a post from which he retired in 1994. Since then he has composed to commission for a wide variety of performers notably the Brunel Ensemble (Symphony No.3, In My Childhood) and the London Children's Ballet (Ballet Shoes, 2001). 

He has collaborated with many other artists of note including the poets John Reed, Seamus Heaney, Michael Longley and Charles Tomlinson, the choreographer Helen Lewis and the founders of the Lyric Theatre, Belfast and written for performers including Peter Pears, Julian Bream, Eric Gruenberg, Cecil Aronowitz, Janet Price, Christopher Austin, Jeremy Huw Williams, David Ogden and the Dartington String Quartet.

As a teacher, Warren's students include a number of composers and musicians who have gone on to have significant careers including: Christopher Austin, Eibhlis Farrell, Philip Hammond, David Byers and Will Todd.

Music

Major works include the oratorio The Passion (1962), Symphony No.1 (1964)  the Violin Concerto (1966), Songs of Old Age (1968), Symphony No.2 (1969),  the oratorio Continuing Cities (1989), Symphony No.3 (1995), In My Childhood (1998) and Cello Requiem (2018) as well as his six operas.

Chamber music includes two Piano sonatas, a Violin sonata, three String quartets and the Piano trio Burnt Norton Sketches (1985), which were later orchestrated by Christopher Austin (1999). Peter Jacobs has recorded the Monody movement from Warren's Second Piano Sonata (1977), which consists of a single line of melody with decoration. Song cycles include Spring 1948 (1956), The Pity of Love (1966), Songs of Old Age (1968), the orchestral song cycle In My Childhood (1998), Another Spring (2008) and The Coming (2010). Music for children and young people includes the opera Finn and the Black Hag (1959), Songs of Unity (1968) written for Methodist College, Belfast and several pieces written for youth orchestras including Ring of Light (2005), A Star Danced (2009) and Variations on a Gloucester Chime (2012). 

His shorter choral works include the cantata The Death of Orpheus (1953 revised 2009), the motet Salvator Mundi (1976), The Starlight Night (1990), the evening canticles written for Bristol Cathedral: The Bristol Service (1991) and Celtic Blessings (1996). Music for dance includes two notable collaborations with Helen Lewis, There is a Time (1970) and the London Children's Ballet, Ballet Shoes (2001).

Warren has worked closely with several poets, providing instrumental music to complement spoken words, including Lares (1972) with Michael Longley and The Sound of Time (1984) with Charles Tomlinson. The first of these was with his contemporary Seamus Heaney, A Lough Neagh Sequence (1970).  Warren wrote:

Heaney made a recording of this version of his poetry with Warren's music in 2011.

Many of his shorter works are among his most powerful including the solo cantata for flute, piano and mezzo soprano, Drop, Drop Slow Tears (1960) and the Song for St. Cecilia’s Day (1967) scored for tenor, flute, viola, guitar and first performed by Peter Pears, Richard Adeney, Cecil Aronowitz and Julian Bream. His best selling work as a recording is the orchestral suite Wexford Bells (1970).

Selected works

(Impulse Music has a complete list)

Discography
 Bristol Service, Bristol Cathedral Choir, Priory PRCD 528
 In My Childhood, A Lough Neagh Sequence, Piano Sonata No 2, on 'The Next Ocean'. Raymond Warren and Seamus Heaney (reader), Philip Mead (piano), Olivia Robinson (soloist), University of Hertfordshire Chamber Orchestra conducted by Robin Browning. UH Recordings (2011)
 Golden Rings, Magnificat and Nunc Dimittis and Salvator Mundi (uncredited recordings)
 Symphony No 3, Pictures with Angels. The Brunel Ensemble conducted by Christopher Austin (1996)
 Monody; Chaconne. Peter Jacobs (piano). Severnside Composers' Alliance Inaugural Piano Recital. Dunelm Records (2005)
 Wexford Bells, Royal Ballet Sinfonia, Gavin Sutherland, on 'British Light Music Discoveries', ASV CD WHL 2126 (2000)

Publications 
 Warren, Raymond: The Composer and Opera Performance in Thomas, W. (ed.), Composition – Performance – Reception: Studies in the Creative Process in Music,  Ashgate, 1998, 
 Davies, Edward. Raymond Warren: A Study of His Music. Work in preparation.

References

External links 
 Composer's Website
 'Shepherds' Dance', from Wexford Bells, Royal Ballet Sinfonia, conducted by Gavin Sutherland
 Impulse Music Consultants, listening page

 

 
 
 

1928 births
20th-century classical composers
Academics of Queen's University Belfast
Academics of the University of Bristol
British classical composers
British male classical composers
Living people
British opera composers
Male opera composers
Alumni of Corpus Christi College, Cambridge
20th-century British composers
20th-century British male musicians